Airport Collaborative Decision Making (A-CDM) is a consortium that aims to improve the operational efficiency of all airport operators. It is a joint venture between ACI EUROPE, EUROCONTROL, International Air Transport Association (IATA) and the Civil Air Navigation Services Organisation (CANSO). It seeks to reduce delays, increase the predictability of events during a flight and optimise the utilisation of resources. 

The effort was expected to increase airport capacity. The tactic is to improve real-time information sharing between airport operators, aircraft operators, ground handlers and air traffic control by modifying operational procedures and automating processes.

History 
By the end of 2020, A-CDM was expected to be fully implemented in the 30 European airports. It was initially deployed at Munich (2017) and Brussels Airport (2010). The list of A-CDM airports numbered 15 by 2015, rising to 20 in 2016, with 15 further airports starting the process.

Participating airports

Americas 
Sao Paulo International Airport (Guarulhos) (GRU)
Toronto Pearson International Airport (YYZ)

Europe 
By the end of 2020, A-CDM was fully implemented in 30 European airports:

Amsterdam (AMS)
Barcelona (BCN)
Berlin Schönefeld (SXF)
Brussels (BRU)
Copenhagen (CPH)
Düsseldorf (DUS)
Frankfurt (FRA)
Geneva (GVA)
Hamburg (HAM)
Helsinki (HEL)
Lisbon (LIS)
London Gatwick (LGW) (Note: DPI message exchange between Gatwick Airport and NMOC temporarily suspended)
London Heathrow (LHR)
Lyon (LYS)
Madrid (MAD)
Milan Linate (LIN)
Milan Malpensa (MXP)
Milan Orio al Serio - Bergamo (BGY)
Munich (MUC)
Naples (NAP)
Oslo Gardermoen (OSL)
Palma de Mallorca (PMI)
Paris Charles De Gaulle (CDG)
Paris Orly (ORY)
Prague (PRG)
Rome Fiumicino (FCO)
Stockholm Arlanda (ARN)
Stuttgart (STR)
Warsaw (WAW)
Venice (VCE)
Zurich (ZRH)

Asia
Incheon (Seoul) (ICN)
New Delhi (DEL)
Mumbai (BOM)
Bangalore (BLR)
Kolkata (CCU)
Chennai (MAA)
Ahmedabad (AMD)
Jaipur (JAI)
Thiruvananthapuram (TRV)
Guwahati (GAU)
Singapore (SIN)
Hong Kong (HKG)
Shanghai Pudong (PVG)
Beijing Capital (PEK)
Kunming (KMG)
Guiyang (KWE)
Bangkok Suvarnabhumi (BKK) (on trial)
Bangkok Don Mueang (DMK) (on trial)

References

External links
 Official Airport Collaborative Decision Making website

Air traffic control in Europe
Air traffic control organizations
International aviation organizations
Transport organizations based in Europe